Kalanchoe robusta is a species of plant in the family Crassulaceae. It is endemic to the Yemeni island of Socotra. Its natural habitat is on rocky slopes and amongst limestone boulders in dwarf shrubland and low succulent shrubland at an altitude of 300–750m. While it is listed by IUCN as belonging to the order Rosales, Kalanchoes and other Crassulaceae are more usually placed in Saxifragales.

References

robusta
Endemic flora of Socotra
Vulnerable flora of Africa
Vulnerable flora of Asia
Taxonomy articles created by Polbot
Taxa named by Isaac Bayley Balfour